Wavala Kali (born 26 June 1954) is a Papua New Guinean sprinter. He competed in the men's 200 metres and the men's 400 m at the 1976 Summer Olympics in Montreal.

References

1954 births
Living people
Athletes (track and field) at the 1974 British Commonwealth Games
Commonwealth Games competitors for Papua New Guinea
Athletes (track and field) at the 1976 Summer Olympics
Papua New Guinean male sprinters
Olympic athletes of Papua New Guinea
Place of birth missing (living people)